Hilarographa muluana is a species of moth of the family Tortricidae. It is found in Sarawak, a Malaysian state on the island of Borneo.

References

Moths described in 2009
Hilarographini